This an alphabetical List of ancient Romans, including citizens of ancient Rome remembered in history.

Note that some people may be listed multiple times, once for each part of the name.

A 
Titus Accius - 
Gaius Acilius - 
Claudia Acte - 
Claudius Aelianus (Aelian) - 
Sextus Aelius Paetus Catus - jurist
Lucius Aelius Caesar - would-be successor to Hadrian
Marcus Aemilius Aemilianus - emperor for three months
Annie Aetius - 
Flavius Aetius - general
Gnaeus Domitius Afer - orator
Lucius Afranius - two; poet and consul
Julius Africanus - two; orator, Christian philosopher
Sextus Caecilius Africanus - jurist
Claudius Agathinus - physician
Gnaeus Julius Agricola - general in Britain
Sextus Calpurnius Agricola - governor in Britain
Marcus Julius Agrippa (Agrippa I) - a king in Judea, romanized
Marcus Julius Agrippa (Agrippa II) - a king in Judea, romanized
Marcus Vipsanius Agrippa - general and geographer
Marcus Vipsanius Agrippa Postumus - son of Agrippa
Vipsania Agrippina - daughter of Agrippa
Agrippina the elder - mother of Caligula
Agrippina the younger - mother of Nero
Gaius Servilius Ahala - legendary hero
Ahenobarbus - several
Aius Locutius - divine
Albinovanus Pedo - poet
Titus Albucius - orator
Gaius Albucius Silus - orator and teacher of rhetoric
Alfenus Varus - jurist
Alfius Avitus - poet
Allectus - assassin of Carausius
Gaius Amafinius - philosopher
Lucius Ambivius Turpio - actor and director
Amelius Gentilianus - philosopher
Ammianus Marcellinus - writer
Lucius Ampelius - writer
Annius Vinicianus - rebel
Lucius Annius Vinicianus - plotter
Gaius Antistius Vetus - consul 30 BC
Gaius Antistius Vetus - Caesar Augustus' quaestor
Gaius Antistius Vetus - consul in 23
Gaius Antistius Vetus - Consul in 110
Gaius Antistius Vetus - consul in 178
Lucius Antistius Vetus - consul
Antonia - several
Antoninus Pius - emperor
Arrius Antoninus - father of the emperor
Antoninus Liberalis - mythographer
Gaius Antonius - two
Iullus Antonius - poet and consul, married Claudia Marcella Major
Lucius Antonius - consul
Marcus Antonius
Marcus Antonius Orator - consul 99 BC
Marcus Antonius Creticus - son of the Orator and father of Mark Antony
Mark Antony - triumvir
Marcus Antonius Antyllus - son of Mark Antony
Antonius Castor - freedman
Antonius Musa - physician
Antonius Diogenes - writer
Marcus Aper - advocate
Aelius Festus Aphthonius - grammarian
Apicius - several gourmets
Lucius Apronius - suffect consul
Pontius Aquila - tribune
Romanus Aquila - rhetor
Manius Aquillius - two consuls
Gaius Aquillius Gallus - jurist
Flavius Arcadius - emperor
Aulus Licinius Archias - poet
Arellius Fuscus - rhetor
Arria Major - wife of Caecina Paetus
Arria Minor - daughter of Arria Major
Flavius Arrianus (Arrian) - historian
Lucius Arruntius the Elder - consul
Lucius Arruntius the Younger - his son, also a consul
Lucius Arruntius Stella - poet
Arruntius Celsus - miscellanist
Lucius Artorius Castus - general in Britain, possible basis for King Arthur
Quintus Junius Arulenus Rusticus - Stoic
Arusianus Messius - grammarian
Quintus Asconius Pedianus  - writer
Sempronius Asellio - historian
Aemilius Asper - commentator
Nonius Asprenas - two rhetors
Lucius Ateius Praetextatus Philologus - scholar
Atia - three Augustan women
Aulus Atilius Caiatinus - consul
Aulus Atilius Serranus - consul
Marcus Atilius - dramatist
Atilius Fortunatianus - metrician
Titus Quinctius Atta - poet
Publius Acilius Attianus - adviser to Hadrian
Caecilia Attica - wife of Agrippa
Titus Pomponius Atticus - businessman and writer
Julius Atticus - writer on vines
Aufidius Bassus - historian
Gnaeus Aufidius - praetor and historian
Sentius Augurinus - friend of Pliny the Younger
Augustus - emperor
Aurelia - mother of Julius Caesar
Lucius Domitius Aurelianus - emperor
Marcus Aurelius - emperor
Lucius Aurelius Marcianus - soldier
Marcus Aurelius Antoninus (Caracalla) - emperor
Sextus Aurelius Victor - historian
Aureolus - soldier
Decimus Magnus Ausonius - poet
Publius Autronius Paetus - consul
Titus Avidius Quietus - suffect consul
Gaius Avidius Nigrinus - possible Hadrian successor
Gaius Avidius Cassius - general
Avienius - writer

B 
Gnaeus Baebius Tamphilus - consul
Marcus Baebius Tamphilus - consul
Quintus Baebius Tamphilus - praetor
Tiberius Claudius Balbilus - astrologer
Decius Caelius Calvinus Balbinus - senator/emperor
Marcus Atius Balbus - praetor, married Julia Minor
Titus Ampius Balbus - tribune and proconsul
Lucius Cornelius Balbus (consul 40 BC) - consul
Lucius Cornelius Balbus (proconsul) - consul's nephew
Balbus - surveyor
Balista - praetorian prefect of Valerian
Quintus Marcius Barea Soranus - suffect consul
Quintus Caecilius Bassus - officer
Caesius Bassus - poet
Saleius Bassus - epic writer
Bavius - bad poet mentioned by Virgil
Belisarius - general
Lucius Calpurnius Bestia - two; a consul and a tribune
Marcus Furius Bibaculus - poet
Marcus Calpurnius Bibulus - consul
Quintus Junius Blaesus - suffect consul
Gaius Blossius - philosophy student
Anicius Manlius Severinus Boethius (Boethius) - consul, writer
Vettius Bolanus - suffect consul
Bonifacius - 4th-century governor of North Africa
Bonosus - revolted against Probus
Tiberius Claudius Caesar Britannicus (Britannicus) - son of Claudius
Bruttidius Niger - aedile
Lucius Junius Brutus - traditional founder of republic
Decimus Junius Brutus - commander
Decimus Junius Brutus Callaicus - consul
Lucius Junius Brutus Damasippus - praetor
Marcus Junius Brutus - plebeian tribune
Marcus Junius Brutus - tyrannicide
Sextus Afranius Burrus - procurator

C 

Caecilius of Novum Comum - poet
Gaius Caecilius Classicus - Governor of Baetica
Caecilus Statius - Gallic poet
Quintus Caecilius Epirota - man of letters
Lucius Caecilius Jucundus - banker in Pompeii
Aulus Caecina Severus - friend of Cicero
Aulus Caecina Severus - legate
Aulus Caecina Alienus - suffect consul
Marcus Caelius Rufus - aedile
Quintus Servilius Caepio - several
Fannius Caepio - conspirator
Gaius Julius Caesar Strabo - orator
Gaius Julius Caesar - dictator, historian, general, writer
Lucius Julius Caesar - several related
Sextus Julius Caesar - several related
Gaius Caesar - consul
Lucius Caesar - second son of Agrippa
Marcus Calidius - praetor
Gaius Julius Callistus - freedman
Calpurnia - two; daughter of Piso, 3rd wife of Pliny
Titus Calpurnius Siculus - writer
Calpurnius Flaccus - writer
Gaius Sextius Calvinus - consul
Gnaeus Domitius Calvinus - consul
Gnaeus Domitius Corbulo - general, 1st century
Gaius Calvisius Sabinus - consul in 39 BC
Gaius Calvisius Sabinus - consul in 4 BC
Gaius Calvisius Sabinus - consul in 26 AD
Gaius Licinius Calvus - orator and poet
Marcus Furius Camillus  - heroic consul
Lucius Furius Camillus - two; consul and son
Publius Canidius Crassus - general
Gaius Caninius Rebilus - briefly suffect consul
Caninius Rufus - neighbor of Pliny
Canius Rufus - poet
Gaius Canuleius - plebeian tribune
Flavius Caper - grammarian
Gaius Ateius Capito - two; tribune, jurist
Marcus Aurelius Maus Carausius - emperor
Gaius Papirius Carbo - consul
Gnaeus Papirius Carbo - consul
Gaius Papirius Carbo Arvina - tribune
Marcus Aurelius Carinus - emperor
Gaius Carrinus - commander
Marcus Aurelius Carus - emperor
Spurius Carvilius Maximus - consul
Spurius Carvilius Ruga - freedman and teacher
Servilius Casca - two conspirators
Cassiodorus - politician and writer
Spurius Cassius Vecellinus - early consul
Lucius Cassius Hemina - annalist
Lucius Cassius Longinus Ravilla - consul
Quintus Cassius Longinus - quaestor
Gaius Cassius Longinus - tyrannicide
Lucius Cassius Longinus - three; two consuls, one proconsul
Cassius Parmensis - two; jurist and tyrannicide
Cassius Severus - orator
Cassius Chaerea - centurion
Lucius Artorius Castus - general in Britain, possible basis for King Arthur
Lucius Sergius Catilina (Catiline) - conspirator
Titus Catius - writer
Cato, Marcus Porcius - the Elder, censor
Cato, Marcus Porcius - the Younger, politician, leader of the conservative faction
Gaius Porcius Cato - two; consul, tribune
Lucius Porcius Cato - consul
Catullus - writer and poet
Gaius Lutatius Catulus - consul
Quintus Lutatius Catulus - two; consul and son
Celsus Albinovanus - friend of Horace
Aulus Cornelius Celsus - encyclopedist
Publius Juventius Celsus - consul
Censorinus - grammarian
Quintus Petillius Cerialis - consul
Gaius Cestius Epulo - praetor
Gaius Cestius Gallus - consul
Lucius Cestius Pius - rhetor
Publius Cornelius Cethegus, politician and consul
Publius Cornelius Cethegus, politician and senator
Flavius Sosipater Charisius - grammarian
Lucius Cornelius Chrysogonus - freedman
Marcus Tullius Cicero - two; politician/writer and son
Quintus Tullius Cicero - two; younger brother of Cicero and son
Lucius Fabius Cilo - governor
Lucius Quinctius Cincinnatus - early hero
Lucius Cincius Alimentus - senator and historian
Lucius Cornelius Cinna - two; politician and son
Gaius Helvius Cinna - poet
Gnaeus Cornelius Cinna Magnus - consul
Gaius Julius Civilis - noble Batavian
Gaius Julius Alpinus Classicianus - procurator
Julius Classicus - rebel Treveri
Claudius Claudianus (Claudian) - poet
Claudius - emperor
Claudia Procula - wife of Pontius Pilate
Claudius II Gothicus - emperor
Appius Claudius Crassus - decemvir
Appius Claudius Caecus - consul
Appius Claudius Caudex - consul
Publius Claudius Pulcher - several
Quintus Claudius - plebeian tribune
Gaius Claudius Pulcher - consul
Appius Claudius Pulcher - three consuls
Marcus Claudius Marcellus Aeserninus - orator and consul
Quintus Claudius Quadrigarius - annalist
Tiberius Claudius - procurator
Claudius Etruscus - son of above
Tiberius Claudius Pompeianus - consul
Claudius Mamertinus - orator
Titus Flavius Clemens (consul) - consul
Clodia - sister of Publius Clodius Pulcher
Clodius Aesopus - tragic actor
Publius Clodius Pulcher - politician
Lucius Clodius Macer - legate
Publius Clodius Quirinalis - rhetor
Decimus Clodius Albinus - would-be emperor
Cloelia - legendary hostage
Aulus Cluentius Habitus - litigant
Lucius Coelius Antipater - jurist, rhetorician, and historian
Gaius Coelius Caldus - consul
Lucius Junius Moderatus Columella = farmer
Cominianus - grammarian
Commodianus - Christian Latin poet
Lucius Aelius Aurelius Commodus - emperor
Constans - emperor
Flavius Valerius Constantinus (Constantine) - emperor
Constantine II - emperor
Flavius Claudius Constantinus - emperor
Flavius Valerius Constantius (Chlorus) - emperor
Constantius II - emperor
Constantius III - emperor
Gnaeus Domitius Corbulo - consul
Gnaeus Marcius Coriolanus - early hero
Cornelia Africana - mother of Tiberius and Gaius Gracchus
Cornelia - Caesar's first wife
Cornelia Metella - wife of Pompey
Gaius Cornelius - tribune
Cornelius Severus - poet
Lucius Cornificius - consul
Quintus Cornificius - orator and poet
Lucius Annaeus Cornutus - freedman teacher
Gaius Julius Cornutus Tertullus - proconsul
Gaius Coruncanius - ambassador
Lucius Coruncanius - ambassador
Tiberius Coruncanius - consul
Titus Statilius Taurus Corvinus - consul
Quintus Conconius - scholar
Aulus Cornelius Cossus - consul
Gaius Aurelius Cotta - consul
Lucius Aurelius Cotta - five different
Marcus Aurelius Cotta - consul
Marcus Julius Cottius - son of a native king
Gaius Calpurnius Crassus Frugi Licinianus - suffect consul
Publius Licinius Crassus Dives Mucianus - consul
Lucius Licinius Crassus - consul
Marcus Licinius Crassus - two; politician and grandson
Publius Licinius Crassus - two; consul and commander
Aulus Cremutius Cordus - historian
Quintus Terentius Culleo - praetor
Curiatius Maternus - senator and poet
Marcus Curtius - legendary hero
Curtius Montanus - poet
Thascius Caecilius Cyprianus (Cyprian) - bishop

D 

Damophilus - sculptor
Lucius Decidius Saxa - tribune
Gaius Messius Quintus Decius - emperor
Publius Decius Mus - three consuls
Publius Decius Subulo - praetor
Quintus Dellius - soldier, writer
Sempronius Densus - soldier
Lucius Siccius Dentatus - early hero
Manius Curius Dentatus - consul
Publius Herennius Dexippus - sophist
Lucius Pollentius Dexter - soldier (Legio I Adiutrix, Centuria Allii Marini)
Titus Didius - consul
Marcus Didius Julianus - short-lived emperor
Dio Cassius - official and historian
Gaius Aurelius Valerius Diocletianus (Diocletian) - emperor
Dioscorides Pedanius - physician
Gnaeus Cornelius Dolabella - two; consul and proconsul
Publius Cornelius Dolabella - two consuls
Titus Flavius Domitianus (Domitian) - two; emperor and adopted son
Flavia Domitilla - mother / sister / niece of Domitian
Gnaeus Domitius Ahenobarbus - four different
Lucius Domitius Ahenobarbus - two
Domitius Marsus - poet
Aelius Donatus - grammarian
Tiberius Claudius Donatus - commentator
Dorotheus - framed Justinian Code
Blossius Aemilius Dracontius - poet and rhetor
Julia Drusilla - daughter of Caligula
Drusus Julius Caesar - two; son of Tiberius and son of Germanicus
Nero Claudius Drusus - general
Marcus Livius Drusus - two; consul and son
Marcus Livius Drusus Claudianus - a praetor
Gaius Duilius - consul

E 

Marcus Egnatius Rufus - praetor
Elagabalus - emperor
Emporius - rhetorician
Empylus - rhetorician
Sextilius Ena - poet
Severus Sanctus Endelechius - professor
Quintus Ennius - writer
Magnus Felix Ennodius - bishop, writer
Epagathus - politician 
Titus Clodius Eprius Marcellus - consul
Erotian - grammarian, doctor
Sextus Erucius Clarus - official and friend of Pliny
Flavius Eugenius - usurper
Eumenius - teacher of rhetoric
Eusebius of Caesarea - theologian
Eutropius - historian
Iulius Exsuperantius - historian

F 
Faberius - secretary to Julius Caesar
Fabianus Papirius - philosopher
Marcus Fabius Ambustus - consul
Quintus Fabius Ambustus - official
Marcus Fabius Buteo - consul
Lucius Fabius Justus - consul
Paullus Fabius Maximus - consul
Quintus Fabius Maximus Allobrogicus - praetor
Quintus Fabius Maximus Aemilianus - consul
Quintus Fabius Maximus Rullianus - consul
Quintus Fabius Maximus Verrucosus, Cunctator - consul
Quintus Fabius Pictor - senator, historian
Fabius Rusticus - historian
Gaius Fabricius Luscinus - consul
Marcus Fadius Gallus - friend of Cicero
Gaius Fannius - consul
Annia Galeria Faustina - two; wife and daughter of Antoninus Pius
Marcus Cetius Faventinus - scholar
Eulogius Favonius - rhetor
Marcus Favonius - politician
Favorinus - rhetor
Marcus Antonius Felix - freedman procurator
Fenestella - annalist
Porcius Festus - procurator
Rufius Festus - writer
Sextus Pompeius Festus - scholar
Gaius Flavius Fimbria - consul
Julius Firmicus Maternus - astrologer
Aulus Avilius Flaccus - official
Quintus Fulvius Flaccus two; consul and son
Lucius Valerius Flaccus four
Marcus Fulvius Flaccus - consul
Verrius Flaccus - freedman scholar
Lucius Quinctius Flamininus - consul
Titus Quinctius Flamininus - consul
Gaius Flaminius - consul
Gnaeus Flavius - writer
Flavius Felix - poet
Titus Flavius Petro - grandfather of Vespasian
Marcus Annius Florianus - short-lived emperor
Florus - poet
Marcus Fonteius - official
Sextus Julius Frontinus - writer
Marcus Cornelius Fronto - orator
Quintus Fufius Calenus - consul
Fabius Planciades Fulgentius - writer
Fulvia - wife of Mark Antony
Gaius Fundanius - comedian
Minicius Fundanus - proconsul
Aulus Furius Antias - poet
Lucius Furius Philus - consul
Cornelius Fuscus - official and general

G 

Aulus Gabinius - two; tribune and consul
Gaius Julius Caesar Germanicus (Caligula) - emperor
Gaius - jurist
Gaius Sulpicius Galba - two; official, grandfather of emperor
Servius Sulpicius Galba - four; two consuls, praetor, emperor
Publius Sulpicius Galba Maximus - consul
Gaius Galerius Valerius Maximinianus (Galerius) - emperor
Galerius Trachalus - orator
Publius Licinius Egnatius Gallienus (Gallienus) - emperor
Lucius Iunius Gallio Annaeanus - consul
Aelius Gallus - official
Appius Annius Trebonius Gallus - consul of 108
Appius Annius Trebonius Gallus - consul of 139
Gaius Asinius Gallus - consul
Gaius Cornelius Gallus - poet and general
Aulus Didius Gallus - consul
Gaius Lucretius Gallus - praetor
Gaius Sulpicius Gallus - astronomer and consul
Gallus Caesar - ruled in Antioch
Quintus Gargilius Martialis - writer
Gavius Bassus - writer
Gavius Silo - orator
Aulus Gellius - writer
Gnaeus Gellius - annalist
Lucius Gellius Poplicola - consul
Geminus - writer
Lucius Genucius - tribune
Germanicus - general, father of Caligula
Gessius Florus - procurator in Judea
Hosidius Geta - writer
Gnaeus Hosidius Geta - suffect consul
Publius Septimius Geta (Geta) - emperor
Manius Acilius Glabrio - four
Gaius Servilius Glaucia - praetor
Glitius Atilius Agricola - general of Trajan
Marcus Antonius Gnipho - scholar
Marcus Antonius Gordianus - three emperors
Gaius Sempronius Gracchus - 2nd-century BC politician
Tiberius Sempronius Gracchus - three politicians
Julius Graecinus - praetor
Granius Licinianus - writer
Flavius Gratian - emperor
Grattius - poet
Grillius - grammarian

H 

Publius Aelius Hadrianus (Hadrian) - emperor
Quintus Haterius - orator
Helvidius Priscus - praetor
Herennius Etruscus - short-lived emperor
Herennius Modestinus - jurist
Herennius Senecio - governor
Herodes Atticus - consul and writer
Aulus Hirtius - consul
Honorius (emperor) - emperor
Horatius Cocles - early hero
Quintus Horatius Flaccus (Horace) - writer
Quintus Hortensius - consul
Hostilian - short-lived emperor
Hostius - poet
Hyginus - three writers
Gaius Julius Hyginus - writer

I 

Lucius Icilius - early hero
Irenaeus - theologian
Isidorus Hispalensis - bishop and scholar
Isigonus - writer

J 

Januarius Nepotianus - writer
Javolenus Priscus - jurist
Jordanes - historian
Flavius Jovian - emperor
Juba I of Numidia
Juba II of Numidia
Juba of Mauretania
Jugurtha - Numidian king
Julia (aunt of Caesar and wife of Marius)
Julia (daughter of Julius Caesar)
Julia - several women of the Julii Caesares
Juliae Caesares (sisters of Julius Caesar)
Julia Flavia - daughter of Titus
Vipsania Julia - granddaughter of Augustus
Julia (mother of Mark Antony)
Julia the Elder, daughter of Augustus
Julia Domna - wife of Septimius Severus
Julia Maesa - sister of Julia Domna
Julia Soaemias Bassiana - daughter of Julia Maesa
Julia Avita Mamaea - younger daughter of Julia Maesa
Flavius Claudius Julianus (Julian) - emperor
Julianus Salvius - jurist
Gaius Julius Bassus - Governor of Bithynia-Pontus
Julius Caesar - general and dictator
Lucius Julius Libo - consul and ancestor to Julius Caesar
Julius Canus - philosopher
Julius Cerealis - poet
Sextus Julius Gabinianus - rhetor
Julius Modestus - freedman of Hyginus
Julius Romanus - grammarian
Julius Tiro - rhetor
Julius Valerius Alexander Polemius - writer
Gaius Julius Victor - writer
Junius Congus - writer
Marcus Junius Nipsus - grammarian
Junius Otho - praetor
Justin Martyr - writer and martyr
Justinian I - emperor
Marcus Justinianus Justinus (Justin) - writer
Decimus Iunius Iuvenalis (Juvenal) - poet
Gaius Vettius Aquilinus Juvencus - Christian poet
Marcus Juventius Laterensis - praetor

L 

Attius Labeo - translator
Cornelius Antistius Labeo - historian
Marcus Antistius Labeo - jurist
Quintus Labienus - general
Titus Labienus - two; legate for Caesar, orator
Lactantius - writer
Lucius Furius - tribune
Gaius Laelius - consul
Gaius Laelius Major - consul
Laelius Archelaus - friend of Lucilius
Marcus Valerius Laevinus - consul
Laevius - writer
 - scholar
Larcius Licinus - writer
Latinus - early hero
Marcus Tullius Laurea - freedman of Cicero
Pompeius Lenaeus - freedman teacher
Gnaeus Cornelius Lentulus - two consuls
Lucius Cornelius Lentulus - consul
Lucius Cornelius Lentulus Crus - consul
Gnaeus Cornelius Lentulus Gaetulicus - two consuls
Gnaeus Cornelius Lentulus Marcellinus - consul
Publius Cornelius Lentulus Spinther - consul
Publius Cornelius Lentulus Sura - consul
Manius Aemilius Lepidus - two consuls
Marcus Aemilius Lepidus - five
Libanius - historian
Licentius - friend of Augustine
Valerius Licinianus Licinius - emperor
Licinius Imbrex - poet
Quintus Ligarius - general
Livia Drusilla - wife of Augustus Caesar
Livilla - daughter of Drusus
Marcus Livius Drusus - reformer
Lucius Livius Andronicus - dramatist
Titus Livius (Livy) - writer
Lollia Paulina - wife of Caligula
Marcus Lollius - rich legate
Lollius Bassus - epigrammatist
Marcus Lollius Palicanus - praetor
Quintus Lollius Urbicus - governor
Marcus Annaeus Lucanus (Lucan) - writer
Lucius Lucceius - praetor
Gaius Lucilius - writer
Gaius Lucilius Iunior - writer
Lucilla - daughter of Marcus Aurelius
Lucretia - early heroine
Lucretius - philosopher
Spurius Lucretius Tricipitinus - early hero
Lucius Licinius Lucullus - six; one aedile, two consuls, two praetors, and son of the conqueror-consul
Marcus Terentius Varro Lucullus - consul
Luscius Lanuvinus - poet
Marcus Lurius - admiral
Quintus Lusius Quietus - suffect consul
Luxorius - writer and poet
Lygdamus - poet

M 

Gaius Licinius Macer - annalist and praetor
Gaius Licinius Macer Calvus - orator and poet
Aemilius Macer - poet
Titus Fulvius Junius Macrianus - emperor
Marcus Opellius Macrinus - emperor
Quintus Naevius Cordus Sutorius Macro - praetorian prefect
Macrobius Ambrosius Theodosius - writer
Gaius Maecenas - friend of Augustus
Lucius Volusius Maecianus - jurist
Spurius Maelius - early hero
Gaius Maenius - consul
Maevius - poet
Flavius Magnus Magnentius - emperor
Magnus Maximus - emperor
Julius Majorian - emperor
Mallius Theodorus - writer
Octavius Mamilius Tusculanus - early hero
Lucius Mamilius - dictator in Tusculum, aided Romans
Gaius Mamilius Limetanus - tribune
Mamurra - associate of Caesar
Gaius Hostilius Mancinus - consul
Gaius Manilius - tribune
Manius Manilius - consul, jurist
Marcus Manilius - writer
Marcus Manlius Capitolinus - saved the Capitol from the Gauls in 390 BC
Gaius Claudius Marcellus Maior, consul in 49 BC
Gaius Claudius Marcellus Minor, consul in 50 BC
Marcus Claudius Marcellus - five
Marcus Pomponius Marcellus - grammarian
Ulpius Marcellus - jurist
Marcia - freedwoman
Ulpia Marciana - sister of Trajan
Aelius Marcianus - jurist
Marcius - writer
Ancus Marcius - early king
Gaius Marcius Rutilus - consul
Marcus Aemilius Scaurus - princeps senatus, leader of the conservative faction
Gaius Marius - general, consul seven times
Marcus Marius Gratidianus - praetor
Sextus Marius - mine owner
Marius Priscus - Governor of the province of Africa
Marius Maximus - writer
Julius Firmicus Maternus - astrologer
Marcus Valerius Martialis (Martial) - writer
Marullus - rhetor
Salonia Matidia - niece of Trajan
Gaius Matius - friend of Cicero
Gnaeus Matius - writer
Mavortius - writer
Marcus Aurelius Valerius Maxentius - emperor
Marcus Aurelius Valerius Maximianus (Maximian) - emperor
Gaius Julius Verus Maximinus - emperor
Gaius Galerius Valerius Maximianus - emperor
Sextus Quinctilius Valerius Maximus - friend of Pliny
Pomponius Mela - geographer
Lucius Annaeus Mela - son of Seneca
Aelius Melissus - writer
Gaius Melissus - freedman of Maecenas
Gaius Memmius - two praetors
Agrippa Menenius Lanatus - early consul
Flavius Merobaudes - soldier, poet
Lucius Cornelius Merula - two consuls
Manius Valerius Maximus Corvinus Messalla - consul
Marcus Valerius Messalla two cousins, one a consul
Marcus Valerius Messalla Corvinus - consul
Marcus Valerius Messalla Messallinus - consul
Vipstanus Messala - tribune
Statilia Messalina - third wife of Nero
Valeria Messalina - Claudius' wife
Caecilia Metella Dalmatica married Marcus Aemilius Scaurus and Sulla
Caecilia Metella - three
Lucius Caecilius Metellus - consul
Quintus Caecilius Metellus - consul
Quintus Caecilius Metellus Balearicus - consul
Quintus Caecilius Metellus Celer - consul
Quintus Caecilius Metellus Creticus - consul
Quintus Caecilius Metellus Delmaticus - consul
Quintus Caecilius Metellus Macedonicus - consul
Quintus Caecilius Metellus Numidicus - consul
Quintus Caecilius Metellus Pius - consul
Quintus Caecilius Metellus Pius Scipio - consul
Mettius Pomposianus - consul
Titus Annius Milo - praetor
Lucius Minucius Esquilinus Augurinus - early consul
Marcus Minucius Felix - writer
Marcus Minucius Rufus - two consuls
Gaius Minucius Augurinus - tribune
Mucia Tertia - wife of Pompey and Gaius Marius the younger
Gaius Licinius Mucianus - consul
Lucius Mummius Achaicus - consul
Lucius Statius Murcus - proconsul
Lucius Licinius Murena - consul
Musaeus Grammaticus - poet
Gaius Musonius Rufus - philosopher

N 

Narses - General
Gnaeus Naevius - poet
Rutilius Claudius Namatianus - poet
Narcissus - freedman of Claudius
Marcus Aurelius Olympius Nemesianus - poet
Cornelius Nepos - writer
Lucius Neratius Priscus - jurist
Nero Claudius Caesar Augustus Germanicus (Nero) - emperor
Gaius Claudius Nero - consul
Tiberius Claudius Nero - praetor
Nero Julius Caesar - son of Germanicus
Lucius Cocceius Nerva - diplomat
Marcus Cocceius Nerva - three; emperor and two consuls
Attus Navius - famous augur during the reign of Tarquinius Priscus
Lucius Septimius Nestor - writer
Virius Nicomachus Flavianus - late politician
Publius Nigidius Figulus - praetor, scholar
Ninnius Crassus - translator
Marcus Fulvius Nobilior - consul
Nonius Marcellus - lexicographer, grammarian
Gaius Norbanus - consul
Aulus Lappius Maximus Norbanus - suffect consul
Quintus Novius - dramatist
Numa Pompilius - king
Marcus Aurelius Numerianus - emperor
Gaius Nymphidius Sabinus - son of a freedwoman, military commander

O 

Iulius Obsequens - writer
Octavia - Major and Minor, two sisters of Augustus
Claudia Octavia - daughter of Claudius
Gaius Octavius - praetor, father of Augustus
Gnaeus Octavius - two consuls
Marcus Octavius - tribune
Septimius Odenathus - king in east
Quintus Lucretius Ofella (Afella) - commander
Quintus Ogulnius Gallus - tribune
Olympiodorus of Thebes - writer, emissary
Olympiodorus the Younger - philosopher, astrologer
Aurelius Opilius - freedman writer
Lucius Opimius - consul
Gaius Oppius - two
Publilius Optatianus Porfyrius - poet
Lucius Orbilius Pupillus - teacher, grammarian
Paulus Orosius - late writer
Publius Ostorius Scapula - Governor of Britain
Titus Otacilius Crassus - praetor
Marcus Salvius Otho - emperor
Publius Ovidius Naso (Ovid) - poet
Ovinius - tribune

P 

Marcus Pacuvius - dramatist
Lucius Caesennius Paetus - consul
Quintus Remmius Palaemon - ex-slave writer
Palfurius Sura - orator
Rutilius Taurus Aemilianus Palladius - farmer
Aulus Cornelius Palma Frontonianus - consul
Gaius Vibius Pansa Caetronianus  - consul
Aemilius Papinianus (Papinian) - jurist
Papirianus - grammarian
Lucius Papirius Cursor - two; heroic consul and son
Gaius Papius Mutilus - Samnite leader
Passienus - orator
Aemilius Lepidus Paullus - consul
Lucius Aemilius Paullus (disambiguation) - several men, including three consuls
Lucius Aemilius Paullus Macedonicus - consul
Julius Paulus - jurist
Paulus Alexandrinus - astrologer
Quintus Pedius - consul
Sextus Pedius - jurist
Marcus Perperna - two consuls
Marcus Perperna Veiento - praetor
Aulus Persius Flaccus - satirist
Publius Helvetius Pertinax - emperor
Gaius Pescennius Niger Justus - emperor
Quintus Petillius - two cousins
Marcus Petreius - governor
Petronius - courtier of Nero
Publius Petronius - suffect consul
Petronius Arbiter - writer
Lucius Petronius Taurus Volusianus praetorian prefect, consul, city prefect
Publius Petronius Turpilianus - consul
Julius Verus Philippus (Philip the Arab) - emperor
Lucius Marcius Philippus - three consuls
Quintus Marcius Philippus - consul
Calpurnius Piso - several 
Gaius Calpurnius Piso - several
Gnaeus Calpurnius Piso - three; two consuls and a governor
Lucius Calpurnius Piso - three consuls
Lucius Calpurnius Piso Caesoninus - consul
Lucius Calpurnius Piso Licinianus - briefly emperor
Lucius Calpurnius Piso Frugi - consul
Marcus Pupius Piso Frugi - consul
Galla Placidia - daughter of Theodosius I
Placidus - grammarian
Lactantius Placidus - different grammarian
Munatia Plancina - friend of Livia
Gnaeus Plancius - aedile
Lucius Munatius Plancus - consul
Titus Munatius Plancus Bursa - tribune
Pompeius Planta - prefect
Aulus Platorius Nepos - consul
Plautia Urgulanilla - Claudius' first wife
Gaius Fulvius Plautianus - consul
Plautius - jurist
Aulus Plautius - consul
Publius Plautius Hypsaeus - praetor, quaestor, and aedile
Plautius Lateranus - senator
Marcus Plautius Silvanus - two; tribune and consul
Tiberius Plautius Silvanus Aelianus - consul
Titus Maccius Plautus - dramatist
Quintus Pleminius - legate
Gaius Plinius Secundus (Pliny the Elder) - scholar
Gaius Plinius Caecilus Secundus (Pliny the Younger) - scholar
Pompeia Plotina - wife of Trajan
Plotinus - philosopher
Plotius Tucca - friend of Virgil
Mestrius Plutarchus (Plutarch) - philosopher, biographer
Gaius Poetelius Libo Visolus - consul
Gaius Asinius Pollio - consul, scholar
Julius Pollux - scholar
Polybius - two; historian and freedman
Tiberius Claudius Pompeianus - consul of Marcus Aurelius
Pompeius Grammaticus - grammarian
 Cealia Pompeius Pulchellus, clergy member in the Temple of Venus 
Gnaeus Pompeius - son of Pompey
Quintus Pompeius - consul
Gnaeus Pompeius Magnus (Pompey) - triumvir
Sextus Pompeius Magnus Pius - son of Pompey
Quintus Pompeius Rufus - consul
Pompeius Saturninus - orator, historian, poet
Pompeius Silo - rhetor
Pompeius Strabo - consul
Pompilius - second king
Lucius Pomponius - poet
Sextus Pomponius - jurist
Marcus Pomponius Bassulus - writer
Titus Pomponius Proculus Vitrasius Pollio - consul
Pomponius Rufus - writer
Pomponius Secundus - consul
Gavius Pontius - Samnite general
Pontius Telesinus - praetor
Pontius Pilatus - prefect of Judaea
Gaius Popillius Laenas - consul
Publius Popillius Laenas - consul
Poppaea Sabina - wife of Nero
Quintus Poppaedius Silo - friend of Drusus
Porcia - daughter of Cato
Porcius Licinus - writer
Marcus Porcius Latro - rhetor
Pomponius Porphyrion - scholar
Porsenna - semi-legendary king
Aulus Postumius - several people
Spurius Postumius Albinus - consul
Lucius Postumius Megellus - consul
Aulus Postumius Tubertus - dictator
Marcus Cassianus Postumus - emperor
Marcus Antonius Primus - general
Priscianus - grammarian
Priscus - politician, historian
Marcus Aurelius Probus - emperor
Valerius Probus - scholar
Saint Procula - wife of Pontius Pilate
Proculus - usurper
Proculus (jurist) - jurist
Sextus Propertius - writer
Aurelius Clemens Prudentius - Christian poet
Quintus Publilius Philo - consul
Publilius Syrus - writer
Volero Publilius - early tribune
Publius Pupius - tragedian

Q 

Gaius Iulius Quadratus Bassus - consul
Asinius Quadratus - senator
Titus Quinctius Capitolinus Barbatus - early consul
Marcus Fabius Quintilianus (Quintilian) - rhetor
Quintus - physician
Quintus Smyrnaeus - poet
Publius Sulpicius Quirinius - consul
Quintus Marcius Rufus - commander of Marcus Crassus

R 

Gaius Rabirius - two; senator and poet
Gaius Rabirius Postumus - senator
Lucius Aemilius Regillus - praetor
Marcus Aqilius Regulus - informer
Marcus Atilius Regulus - consul
Publius Memmius Regulus - consul
Remus - mythical founder
Reposianus - poet
Quintus Marcius Rex - two; praetor and consul
Flavius Ricimer - late patrician
Romulus - mythical founder
Romulus Augustulus - last western emperor
Sextus Roscius - client of Cicero
Lucius Roscius Otho - tribune
Quintus Roscius Gallus - actor
Rubellius Blandus - rhetor
Gaius Rubellius Blandus - consul
Rubellius Plautus - relative of Nero
Rubellia Bassa - half-sister to above
Rufinus - Christian writer and grammarian
Flavius Rufinus - adviser to Arcadius
Curtius Rufus - proconsul
Quintus Curtius Rufus - rhetor, historian
Cluvius Rufus - historian
Publius Servilius Rullus - tribune
Publius Rupilius - consul
Gaius Rutilius Gallicus - consul
Publius Rutilius Lupus - grammarian
Publius Rutilius Rufus - consul

S 

Vibia Sabina - wife of Hadrian
Sabinus - friend of Ovid
Titus Flavius Sabinus II - elder brother of Vespasian
Titus Flavius Sabinus III and IV - consuls
Masurius Sabinus - jurist
Marius Plotius Sacerdos - grammarian
Julius Sacrovir - Aedui noble
Saevius Nicanor - grammarian
Marcus Livius Salinator - consul & founder of Forlì
Sallustius – Neoplatonist author
Gaius Sallustius Crispus - two; historian (Sallust) and his adopted son
Gaius Sallustius Passienus Crispus - consul, grandson of Sallust
Salvianus - writer
Quintus Salvidienus Rufus - general of Octavian
Lucius Antonius Saturninus - usurper
Lucius Appuleius Saturninus - tribune
Gaius Sentius Saturninus - consul
Gaius Mucius Scaevola - legendary hero
Publius Mucius Scaevola - two consuls
Quintus Mucius Scaevola - two consuls
Cassius Scaevus-Centurion of Julius Caesar's 8th legion.
Marcus Aemilius Scaurus - three; two consuls and a praetor
Lucius Cornelius Scipio - two; consul and son of Scipio Africanus Major
Publius Cornelius Scipio - two; son of Scipio Africanus Major and father of Scipio Africanus Minor
Scipio Africanus - general, victor at the Second Punic War
Publius Cornelius Scipio Aemilianus Africanus Minor - general, victor at the Third Punic War
Lucius Cornelius Scipio Asiaticus - consul
Lucius Cornelius Scipio Barbatus - consul
Gnaeus Cornelius Scipio Calvus - consul
Publius Cornelius Scipio Nasica - consul
Publius Cornelius Scipio Nasica Corculum - consul
Publius Cornelius Scipio Salvito - consul
Publius Cornelius Scipio Nasica Serapio - consul
Scribonia - wife of Octavian
Lucius Arruntius Scribonianus - two; consul and son
Lucius Scribonius Libo - consul
Marcus Scribonius Libo Drusus - great-grandson of Pompey
Scribonius Largus - physician
Gnaeus Tremellius Scrofa - writer
Julius Secundus - orator
Sedulius - Christian Latin poet
Sejanus, Aelius - prefect of the Praetorian Guard
Lucius Seius Strabo - A prefect, father of Sejanus
Lucius Annaeus Seneca - two writers, Seneca the Elder and Seneca the Younger
Senecio, brother of Bassianus (senator)
Senecio Memmius Afer, senator
Lucius Alfenus Senecio, last governor of all of Roman Britain
Marcus Valerius Senecio, governor of Germania Inferior (222-22?) 
Quintus Sosius Senecio  - senator
Publius Septimius - writer
Septimius Serenus - poet
Serenus Sammonicus - writer
Quintus Serenus - medical writer
Sergius - multiple people
Marcus Sergius - tribune with iron hand
Serranus - poet
Quintus Sertorius - praetor
Sulpicius Lupercus Servasius - writer
Lucius Julius Servianus - consul
Servilia - mother of Marcus Junius Brutus
Publius Servilius Vatia - consul
Publius Servilius Isauricus - consul
Marcus Servilius Nonianus - consul
Servius - grammarian, commentator
Servius Tullius - early king
Publius Sestius - praetor
Lucius Septimius Severus - emperor
Marcus Aurelius Severus Alexander - emperor
Sextus Julius Severus - consul
Flavius Valerius Severus - emperor
Sulpicius Severus - historian
Quintus Sextius - philosopher
Titus Sextius - governor
Sextus - two; teacher and writer
Sextus Empiricus - doctor and philosopher
Gnaeus Sicinius - tribune
Siculus Flaccus - grammarian
Gaius Sollius Apollinaris Sidonius - official, writer
Decimus Junius Silanus - two; consul and adulterer
Gaius Junius Silanus - consul
Gaius Appius Junius Silanus - consul
Marcus Junius Silanus - three consuls
Decimus Junius Silanus Torquatus - consul
Lucius Junius Silanus Torquatus - two; consul and victim
Marcus Junius Silanus Torquatus - consul
Gaius Silius - lover of Messalina
Publius Silius Nerva - consul
Silius Italicus - consul, poet
Lucius Cornelius Sisenna - praetor, historian
Publius Sittius - wealthy businessman
Gaius Iulius Solinus - geographer
Gaius Sosius - consul
Quintus Sosius Senecio - consul
Titus Vestricius Spurinna - consul
Staberius Eros - ex-slave scholar
Titus Statilius Taurus - consul
Publius Papinius Statius - poet
Stertinius - writer
Flavius Stilicho - general
Lucius Aelius Stilo Praeconinus - scholar
Gaius Licinius Stolo - early tribune
Sueis - writer
Gaius Suetonius Paulinus - consul
Gaius Suetonius Tranquillus - writer
Publius Suillius Rufus - consul
Lucius Cornelius Sulla (Sulla) - dictator
Publius Cornelius Sulla - consul
Faustus Cornelius Sulla - son of Sulla
Sulpicia - two writers
Servius Sulpicius - poet
Sulpicius Apollinaris - scholar
Sulpicius Blitho - historian
Quintus Sulpicius Camerinus - poet
Publius Sulpicius Rufus - praetor
Servius Sulpicius Rufus - consul
Lucius Licinius Sura - consul
Quintus Aurelius Symmachus - consul Sappho - poet

T 

Cornelius Tacitus - historian
Marcus Claudius Tacitus - emperor
Tanaquil - semi-legendary woman
Tanusius Geminus - historian
Lucius Tarius Rufus - consul
Tarpeia - semi-legendary woman
Lucius Tarquinius Collatinus - semi-legendary founder
Tarquinius Priscus - king
Tarquinius Superbus - last king of Rome
Tarquitius Priscus - writer
Titus Tatius - king
Publius Terentius Afer (Terence) - dramatist
Terentia - first wife of Cicero
Terentianus Maurus - grammarian
Quintus Terentius Scaurus - grammarian
Quintus Septimius Florens Tertullianus (Tertullian) - Christian writer
Gaius Pius Esuvius Tetricus - emperor
Theodosius I - emperor
Theodosius II - emperor
Publius Clodius Thrasea Paetus - consul
Tiberius Julius Caesar Augustus (Tiberius) - emperor
Tiberius Julius Caesar Gemellus - victim
Tiberius Julius Alexander - Jewish official
Albius Tibullus - poet
Gaius Oponius Tigellinus - official
Gaius Furius Sabinus Aquila Timesitheus - praetorian prefect
Marcus Tullius Tiro - freedman of Cicero
Julius Titianus - writer
Titinius - poet
Gnaeus Octavius Titinius Capito - general
Gaius Titius - orator
Marcus Titius - consul
Titius Aristo - jurist
Titus Flavius Vespasianus (Titus) - emperor
Titus Larcius - early dictator
Titus Manlius Torquatus - two; hero and consul
Quintus Trabea - writer
Marcus Ulpius Traianus (Trajan) - emperor
Gaius Trebatius Testa - jurist
Trebius Niger - writer
Gaius Vibius Trebonianus Gallus - emperor
Gaius Trebonius  - proconsul
Gaius Valerius Triarius - general
Tribonianus - jurist collaborator with Justinian I
Pompeius Trogus - historian
Lucius Aelius Tubero - friend of Cicero
Quintus Aelius Tubero - jurist, annalist
Gaius Sempronius Tuditanus - consul
Publius Sempronius Tuditanus - consul
Tullia, villainous daughter of Servius Tullius, the sixth Roman king
Tullia - daughter of Cicero
Tullus Hostilius - king
Quintus Marcius Turbo - official
Turia - wife of Quintus Lucretius Vespillo, consul
Turnus - two; legendary hero and satirist
Sextus Turpilius - writer
Turrianus Gracilis - writer
Clodius Turrinus - two rhetoricians
Tuticanus - friend of Ovid

U 

Ulpianus of Ascalon - rhetor
Domitius Ulpianus - jurist
Marcus Ulpius Traianus - consul, father of Trajan
Urbanus - scholar

V 

Septimius Vaballathus - king under Aurelian
Vagellius - poet
Valens - emperor
Fabius Valens - consul
Vettius Valens - astrologer
Valentinian I - emperor
Valentinian II - emperor
Valentinian III - emperor
Publius Licinius Valerianus (Valerian) - emperor
Valerius Aedituus - epigrammatist
Valerius Antias - annalist
Decimus Valerius Asiaticus - consul
Publius Valerius Cato - scholar, poet
Marcus Valerius Corvus - hero
Gaius Calpetanus Valerius Festus - consul
Gaius Valerius Flaccus - poet
Lucius Valerius Licinianus - orator
Valerius Maximus - historian
Publius Valerius Poplicola - early consul
Lucius Valerius Potitus - three consuls
Quintus Valerius Soranus - scholar
Quintus Valerius Orca - praetor
Valgius Rufus - consul
Vallius Syriacus - rhetor
Varenus Rufus - Governor of Bithynia-Pontus
Quintus Vargunteius - lecturer
Quintus Varius - tribune
Varius Rufus - poet
Gaius Terentius Varro - consul
Marcus Terentius Varro - encyclopedist
Publius Terentius Varro Atacinus - writer
Aulus Terentius Varro Murena - writer
Publius Attius Varus - governor
Publius Quinctilius Varus - general
Quinctilius Varus - son of general
Arrius Varus - praetorian prefect
Julianus Vatinius - general
Publius Vatinius - consul
Publius Vedius Pollio - freedman's son
Flavius Vegetius Renatus  - writer
Aulus Didius Gallus Fabricius Veiento - consul
Velius Longus - scholar
Velleius Paterculus - historian
Venantius Honorius Clementianus Fortunatus - poet
Vennonius - historian
Publius Ventidius - consul
Ventidius Cumanus - procurator of Judea
Verginia - legendary victim
Verginius Flavus - teacher
Lucius Verginius Rufus - consul and leader of rebellion against Nero
Gaius Verres - proconsul
Lucius Verus - emperor
Titus Flavius Vespasianus (Vespasian) - emperor
Lucius Vettius - accuser
Vettius Philocomus - friend of Lucilius
Lucius Vettius Scato - praetor
Vettius Valens - astronomer/astrologer
Caelius Vibenna - semi-legendary figure who gave his name to the Caelian hill, but real Etruscan from Vulci, Caile Vipinas
Quintus Vibius Crispus - consul
Gaius Vibius Marsus - consul
Gaius Vibius Maximus - consul
Gaius Vibius Rufus - consul
Gaius Marius Victorinus - writer
Maximus Victorinus - grammarian
Lucius Villius Annalis - tribune
Gaius Julius Vindex - rebel
Lucius Vinicius - two; father and son, both consuls
Marcus Vinicius - consul
Publius Vinicius - consul
Titus Vinius - consul
Vipsania Julia - granddaughter of Augustus
Publius Vergilius Maro (Virgil) - writer
Viriathus - semi-legendary writer
Aulus Vitellius - emperor
Lucius Vitellius - consul
Vitruvius - architect
Gaius Dillius Vocula - legate
Volcatius Sedigitus - writer
Volcacius Moschus - writer
Lucius Voltacilius Pitholaus
Publius Volumnius - philosopher, companion of Brutus
Gnaeus Manlius Vulso
Lucius Manlius Vulso Longus

W

X

Z  
 Zenobia- Ancient Roman leader

See also
 List of Roman emperors
 List of Roman generals
 List of Roman women
 Political institutions of ancient Rome#Lists of individual office holders
 List of ancient doctors